The Coady International Institute is located on the campus of St. Francis Xavier University in Antigonish, Nova Scotia. Established in 1959,  Coady  Institute is named for Rev. Dr. Moses M. Coady, a founder of the Antigonish Movement - a people's movement for economic and social justice that began in Nova Scotia during the 1920s.

The Coady Institute offers certificate programs in the following areas: Advocacy and Citizen Engagement, Building on Local and Indigenous Knowledge for Community-Driven Development, Communication and Social Media, Community Development Leadership by Women, Community-Based Conflict Transformation & Peacebuilding, Community-Based Microfinance, Community-Based Microfinance (offering in Ethiopia), Community-Based Natural Resource Management, Community-Driven Health Impact Assessment Facilitation and Training Approaches for Community Change, Good Governance and Social Accountability Tools, Learning Organizations and Change, Livelihoods and Markets, Livelihoods & Markets (offering in Ethiopia), Mobilizing Assets for Community-Driven Development, Partnerships in a Multi-Stakeholder Environment, Skills for Social Change, Indigenous Women in Community Leadership, Global Change Leaders.

References

International research institutes
St. Francis Xavier University